Jalmari Verneri Sauli (born Hjalmar Verner Saxelin; 17 August 1889 – 22 April 1957) was a Finnish writer and track and field athlete who competed in the 1908 Summer Olympics.

Athletics

Olympics
Sauli entered five events at the 1908 Olympics.

Records 

Sauli posted 25.38 metres in two-handed shot put in Stockholm on 13 September 1908. This was declared a world record.

Sauli became the first Finn to exceed 14 metres in shot put, when he put 14.06 metres on 5 September 1908.

White Guard 

Sauli joined the Mänttä White Guard as it was taking form in November 1917 and became its chief of logistics. He was wounded in the Finnish Civil War. He was the local chief of Mänttä White Guard in 1919–1921, and a member of staff of North Tavastia White Guard District in 1920.

He was the editor-in-chief of the White Guard magazine Varsinais-Suomen vartio.

Writer 

Sauli was the assistant editor-in-chief of Aamulehti in 1911–1914. He was the editor-in-chief of the newspaper Hämeen Sanomat in 1914–1917 and the regional weekly Järviseutu in 1937–1939 and 1941–1944.

His impetus to start writing novels was a months-long recovery period after being wounded in the Finnish Civil War. The resulting book Valkoinen varjo drew from his experiences in the war, and is credited as the first Finnish adventure novel. The book was handed out as an award by the White Guard. Sauli's patriotic views became the base for his literary career.

He mostly wrote novels for young adults, in the genres of historical and wilderness adventure. He also wrote novels for adults, plays and children's books. His books have been reprinted the last time in the 1980s.

He won the Finnish State Prize for Literature in 1928 for Himmeli and in 1937 for Vanha savenvalaja.

He used the pseudonyms Heikki Hernesmaa and Samuli.

Family 

Father was industrialist Carl Otto Saxelin and mother Saida Maria Blåfield.

Brother Jonni Sauli was a professor of agriculture at the University of Helsinki. Brother Into Saxelin was a sculptor.

Jalmari, Saida and Jonni finnicized their family name from Saxelin to Sauli on 6 April 1908.

His first marriage was to Lyyli Allas in 1909–1929 and second to Kaarina Helena Pirjola from 1931.

Son Jaakko Sauli won two Finnish national championship golds in relay races in 1935 and 1936. He was a company commander in the Bicycle Battalion 5 during the Winter War, when a close-range machine gun burst from a tank wounded him lethally.

Sources

References 

1889 births
1957 deaths
People from Hämeenlinna
Finnish writers
Finnish male javelin throwers
Finnish male discus throwers
Finnish male shot putters
Olympic athletes of Finland
Athletes (track and field) at the 1908 Summer Olympics